NUHS may refer to:

Education
 National University of Health Sciences, an alternative medicine institution in the United States
 Nevada Union High School
 New Urban High School
 New Utrecht High School
 New Ulm High School

Healthcare
 National University Health System, a group of healthcare institutions in Singapore